Anjali Menon is an Indian filmmaker and screenwriter who predominantly works in Malayalam cinema. Anjali has won international, national and state awards for her work and is best known for her feature films Manjadikuru, Kerala Cafe (Happy Journey), Ustad Hotel, Bangalore Days, Koode and Wonder Women. 
She is counted among the change agents in Indian cinema whose work gets attention from the audience and the critics. Anjali is the founder of Little Films  a film company based in Mumbai and Kerala that produces fiction and non-fiction works. Anjali is one of the founders of the Women in Cinema Collective (WCC), an organization that focuses on gender equality in the Malayalam film industry.

She is the board member of Mumbai Academy of the Moving Image.

Early life and education
Anjali Menon was born in Kozhikode to T M Nair and Sarada Nair.  She spent her childhood in Dubai, United Arab Emirates and travelled annually to India. 

Prior to her film education Anjali graduated from Providence Women's College, Kozhikode and received her Masters in Communication Studies from Pune University. Anjali has trained in Indian classical dance and music.Alumna of London Film School, Anjali postgraduated with Honors in Film Direction, Film Producing and Film Editing in 2003.

Personal life
She lives in Mumbai with her husband and son.

Career

Anjali started her career by editing and assisting producers in the making of educational documentaries. She took up event photography and feature writing for journals.
Black Nor White
Black Nor White, was Anjali Menon’s graduation film produced by Asif Kapadia at London Film School starring Rez Kempton and Archie Panjabi, was premiered at the Palm Springs International Film Festival and won the British Film Institute ImagineAsia award.

Manjadikuru 

Anjali’s feature film debut Manjadikuru (2008), a coming of age drama set in early 80's. It won the FIPRESCI award for the Best Malayalam film and Hassankutty Award for Best Indian Debut Director at International Film Festival of Kerala. Manjadikuru aka Lucky Red Seeds swept the Grand Jury awards at the South Asian International Film festival with Best Film, Best Director, Best Screenplay, Best Cinematography and Best Upcoming talent. Anjali also received Kerala State Film Award for Best Screenplay for the movie.
SAIFF reviewer Dustin Chang  described it as “The film is all about the colors, sounds and wonders of childhood. It feels similar to reading an Arundhati Roy story. The imagery is so striking you could almost smell it.” 
Manjadikuru’s postproduction was put on hold for 4 years due to producer related issues. Anjali’s company Little Films India took over the project, completed the film and had a release in 2012 to excellent reviews but the film had a limited box office run.

Kerala Cafe 

While Manjadikuru was on hold Anjali worked on her first theatre release - Kerala Cafe (2009), then first-ever Malayalam anthology film produced by Ranjith Balakrishnan, Capitol Theatre for which she directed the humorous segment 'Happy Journey', centered around gender politics. Happy Journey featuring Jagathy Sreekumar & Nithya Menen was premiered at the Abu Dhabi International Film festival and won the NETPAC award at IFFK 2009. ‘Happy Journey’ was recognised as a fresh new voice in the industry.

Ustad Hotel 

Anjali wrote the story, screenplay and dialogues of the critically and commercially acclaimed Ustad Hotel (2012), directed by Anwar Rasheed. Ustad Hotel is a relationship drama of an NRI youngster and his grandfather who runs a seaside restaurant. Lauded for its local flavour and cross generational appeal Ustad Hotel was a huge commercial success and Anjali won the National Film Award for Best Screenplay (Dialogues) at the 60th National Film Awards while the film won the National Awards for Most Popular Film. Anjali won the Best Writer awards at Asianet Film Awards and Vanitha Film Awards.

Bangalore Days 

In 2014 Anjali wrote and directed Bangalore Days (2014), revolving around the life of three Malayali cousins who move to Bangalore, which became a huge commercial success and which identified her as a commercially successful filmmaker who made sensible cinema.
The ensemble cast consisted of Dulquer Salman, Nivin Pauly, Nazriya Nazim, Fahadh Fazil, Parvathy Thiruvoth, Nithya Menen, Isha Talwar, Kalpana and it was the first film produced by Anwar Rasheed Entertainment in association with Weekend Blockbusters. As per the industry, Bangalore Days was instantly declared “super bumper mega hit” when it released  and went on to become the entry point film for non-Malayalees into Malayalam cinema. 
Anjali won the Kerala State Award for Best Writer & Best Director at the Filmfare Awards & the Asianet Film Awards

Koode 

Anjali wrote and directed and co-produced the commercially and critically acclaimed Koode (2018), which showcased issues of migrant workers and child sexual harassment as it dealt with themes of loss and solace. Starring Prithviraj, Parvathy, Nazriya Nazim & Ranjith Balakrishnan, it was lauded for its performances and poetic storytelling. Koode was the official adaptation of Marathi film ‘Happy Journey’ by Sachin Kundalkar but with many new layers that Anjali brought in

Wonder Women 

Anjali Menon's OTT debut was Wonder Women, a film she wrote and directed in English. A slice of life drama that dealt with the prenatal experiences of six pregnant women who meet at a prenatal class. The film was released on Sony Liv and produced by RSVP Movies and Flying Unicorn Entertainment. The cast consisted of Nadiya Moidu, Parvathy Thiruvothu, Nithya Menen, Amruta Subhash, Padmapriya Janakiraman, Sayanora Philip and Archana Padmini.

Other work 
Anjali is a motivational speaker who addresses subjects related to filmmaking, community, gender empowerment, entrepreneurship and parenting at venues like TED, TISS, TIE Global, CII, KSUM, and IGCE. Anjali has been a jury member for IFFK, MAMI, IFP and Filmfare awards. 
Anjali works towards cultural conservation through documenting cultural performers  and gathering lore. Anjali has published short stories, screenplays and articles and she blogs about her worldviews . Anjali is on the Board of Trustees of MAMI - Mumbai Academy of Moving Images  and a General Council Member of the Kerala Chalachithra Academy.

Themes & influences 
Anjali's movies have depicted themes of family, migrant experience, gender and cross-cultural interactions. She has mentioned Mira Nair, Padmarajan, Krzysztof Kieslowski, Robert Altman, Gulzar, and Marion Hansel as her inspirations, in pursuing film-making.

She portrays stories of non-resident Indians in her work and referred to her reverse migrant identity and hybrid sensibility in her work as an advantage.
Anjali is vocal about the need for gender equality in the workplace  and sensitivity in on-screen portrayals.

Filmography

Awards

References

External links
 

Living people
Malayalam film directors
Malayalam screenwriters
Indian documentary filmmakers
People from Dubai
Indian expatriates in the United Arab Emirates
Indian women film directors
Indian women film producers
Alumni of the London Film School
Indian women screenwriters
21st-century Indian women writers
Women writers from Kerala
Film directors from Kerala
Film producers from Kerala
21st-century Indian film directors
21st-century Indian dramatists and playwrights
21st-century Indian women artists
Women artists from Kerala
Screenwriters from Kerala
Indian women documentary filmmakers
Businesswomen from Kerala
Best Dialogue National Film Award winners
1979 births
21st-century Indian screenwriters